The 1975–76 UCLA Bruins men's basketball team represented the University of California, Los Angeles in the 1975–76 NCAA Division I men's basketball season. Gene Bartow as the first coach of the post-Wooden era, began his first year as head coach.

The Bruins were ranked #2 in the polls and opened in St. Louis against #1 Indiana, and lost 64–84. UCLA won the Pac-8 title (regular season) and accepted the bid to the 32-team NCAA tournament. They advanced to the Final Four, but lost again to eventual champion Indiana, 51–65. This was the last of ten consecutive Final Fours for UCLA, going back to March 1967 (an NCAA record streak); they were upset in the Sweet 16 in 1977.

Starting lineup

Roster

Schedule

|-
!colspan=9 style=|Regular Season

|-
!colspan=12 style="background:#;"| NCAA Tournament

Source

Notes

References

UCLA Bruins men's basketball seasons
Ucla
NCAA Division I men's basketball tournament Final Four seasons
UCLA
UCLA
UCLA